Ibrahim Kalil Konaté (2 August 1955 – 14 August 2021) was a Guinean politician and computer scientist.

Biography
Konaté was born in Kankan on 2 August 1977 and attended primary school at the École primaire Dramé Oumar Kankan. In 1998, he earned a degree in mathematical science from the Lycée Aviation Conakry. He also earned a degree in management informatics from the Université International Collège.

Ibrahim Kalil was appointed Minister of National Education and Literacy on 27 February 2017 and served until 26 May 2018. He served as Chairman of the Board of Directors of the Loterie nationale de Guinée from 29 January 2019 until his death.

Ibrahim Kalil Konaté died of COVID-19 in Conakry on 14 August 2021, at the age of 44.

Awards
COPE-Guinée Prize for good performance (2017)

References

1955 births
2021 deaths
Government ministers of Guinea
Rally of the Guinean People politicians
Computer scientists
People from Kankan
Deaths from the COVID-19 pandemic in Guinea